John Urquhart (1860 – January 19, 1925) was an American politician in the state of Washington. He served in the Washington House of Representatives.

References

Democratic Party members of the Washington House of Representatives
1860 births
1925 deaths